Withernwick is a village and civil parish in the East Riding of Yorkshire, England.

According to the 2011 UK census, Withernwick parish had a population of 453, a reduction on the 2001 UK census figure of 474.

The parish church of St Alban is a Grade II listed building.

Over the past few years the village has been in decline, having lost its post office, school, Methodist chapel and village hall.

References

External links

Villages in the East Riding of Yorkshire
Holderness
Civil parishes in the East Riding of Yorkshire